Abagrotis is a genus of moths of the family Noctuidae.

Species
 Abagrotis alampeta Franclemont, 1967
 Abagrotis alcandola (Smith, 1908)
 Abagrotis alternata (Grote, 1865) – greater red dart moth
 Abagrotis anchocelioides (Guenée, 1852) – blueberry budworm moth
 Abagrotis apposita (Grote, 1878)
 Abagrotis barnesi Benjamin, 1921 (syn. for Abagrotis orbis)
 Abagrotis baueri McDunnough, 1949
 Abagrotis belfragei (Smith, 1890)
 Abagrotis bimarginalis (Grote, 1883)
 Abagrotis brunneipennis Grote, 1875
 Abagrotis cryptica Lafontaine, 1998
 Abagrotis cupida Grote, 1865 – Cupid dart moth
 Abagrotis denticulata McDunnough, 1946
 Abagrotis dickeli Lafontaine, 1998
 Abagrotis discoidalis (Grote, 1876)
 Abagrotis dodi McDunnough, 1927
 Abagrotis duanca (Smith, 1908)
 Abagrotis erratica (Smith, 1890)
 Abagrotis forbesi (Benjamin, 1921)
 Abagrotis glenni Buckett, 1968
 Abagrotis hennei Buckett, 1968
 Abagrotis hermina Lafontaine, 1998
 Abagrotis kirkwoodi Buckett, 1968
 Abagrotis magnicupida Lafontaine, 1998
 Abagrotis mexicana Lafontaine, 1998
 Abagrotis mirabilis (Grote, 1879)
 Abagrotis nanalis (Grote, 1881)
 Abagrotis nefascia (Smith, 1908) (syn: Abagrotis crumbi Franclemont, 1955)
 Abagrotis orbis Grote, 1876
 Abagrotis petalama Lafontaine, 1998
 Abagrotis placida (Grote, 1876)
 Abagrotis pulchrata (Blackmore, 1925)
 Abagrotis reedi Buckett, 1969
 Abagrotis rubricundis Buckett, 1968
 Abagrotis scopeops (Dyar, 1904) (syn: Abagrotis tecatensis Buckett, 1968)
 Abagrotis striata Buckett, 1968
 Abagrotis trigona (Smith, 1893)
 Abagrotis turbulenta McDunnough, 1927
 Abagrotis variata (Grote, 1876)
 Abagrotis vittifrons (Grote, 1864)

References

 Abagrotis at Markku Savela's Lepidoptera and some other life forms
 Natural History Museum Lepidoptera genus database

 
Noctuinae
Noctuoidea genera